Love Concent is Hitomi's eighth studio album and eleventh album overall, released in 2006. This album is her first album since Traveler, which was released on May 12, 2004. This album features five singles — "Japanese Girl", "Love Angel", "Cra"g"y Mama", "Go My Way", and "Ai no Kotoba".

Hitomi wrote all lyrics on the album. In addition, she composed change yourself, Lost Emotion in Darkness and so you, making Love Concent the album on which Hitomi has exercised the most creative influence.

The album contains thirteen songs, seven of them being never-before-released. The DVD portion contains five PVs. First press edition of this album will add a 28-page photobook that was shot in Los Angeles as well as two additional video clips on the DVD.

Track listing

Charts and sales

Oricon sales charts (Japan)

Singles

References
Official hitomi Site
Official hitomi discography
http://www.cdjapan.co.jp/detailview.html?KEY=AVCD-23032

2006 albums
Hitomi albums